O'Casey is a common variation of the Gaelic cathasaigh, meaning vigilant or watchful, with the added anglicized prefix O' of the Gaelic Ó, meaning grandson or descendant. At least six different septs used this name, primarily in the Counties of Cork and Dublin.

People with the surname O'Casey include:
 Seán O'Casey (1880–1964), Irish playwright
 Eileen O'Casey (1900–1995), Irish actress, author, and wife of Sean O'Casey
 Breon O'Casey (1928–2011), son of Seán and Eileen O'Casey
 Lance O'Casey, cartoon character
 Ronan O'Casey (1922–2012), Canadian actor and producer
 O'Casey (O'Cathasaigh), chief of Saithne, now Sonagh, in Westmeath; see Tuite Baronets

See also 
 Casey (surname)
 Casey (disambiguation)

References 

Surname DB
Irish Family Names
The Casey Clan

External links
 http://caseycloudconcepts.blogspot.com/2011/01/whats-in-name-casey.html?showComment=1350277679751#c2813048136101307288

Surnames
Irish families
Surnames of Irish origin
Anglicised Irish-language surnames
Patronymic surnames